Az Yet is the eponymous debut album by American R&B recording group Az Yet, released in 1996. The album spawned two charting singles including the lead single "Last Night" and the cover of the Chicago song, "Hard to Say I'm Sorry". As of April 2002, the album has sold over a million, being certified Platinum.

Track listing

Charts
Az Yet reached number 18 on the Billboard Top R&B/Hip-Hop Albums chart. Two singles from the album had success on the music charts as well. The single "Last Night" charted on four separate Billboard charts, including number one on the Hot R&B/Hip-Hop Singles and Tracks, number 4 on the Rhythmic Top 40, number 5 on the Hot Dance Music/Maxi-Singles Sales and number 9 on the Hot 100. The single "Hard to Say I'm Sorry" charted on seven separate Billboard charts, reaching number 8 on the Hot 100 and number 9 on the Rhythmic Top 40.

Weekly charts

Year-end charts

Certifications

References

1996 debut albums
Az Yet albums
LaFace Records albums
Albums produced by Babyface (musician)
Albums produced by Brian McKnight